The 2008 All-Ireland Minor Hurling Championship was the 78th staging of the All-Ireland Minor Hurling Championship since its establishment by the Gaelic Athletic Association in 1928. The championship began on 29 March 2008 and ended on 7 September 2008.

Tipperary entered the championship as the defending champions in search of a third successive title, however, they were beaten by Kilkenny in the All-Ireland semi-final.

On 7 September 2008 Kilkenny won the championship following a 3-6 to 0-13 defeat of Galway in a replay of the All-Ireland final. This was their 19th All-Ireland title overall and their first title since 2003.

Wexford's Michael O'Hanlon was the championship's top scorer with 3-37.

Results

Leinster Minor Hurling Championship

Group 1A

Group 1B

Group 2

Second round

Quarter-finals

Semi-finals

Final

Munster Minor Hurling Championship

Quarter-finals

Play-off

Semi-finals

Final

Ulster Minor Hurling Championship

Quarter-final

Semi-finals

Final

All-Ireland Minor Hurling Championship

Quarter-finals

Semi-finals

Final

Championship statistics

Top scorers

Top scorer overall

Miscellaneous

 The Leinster Championship game between Westmeath and Wicklow went ahead in spite of the latter team only fielding 13 players. They were reduced to just 12 players during the first half when a player went off injured. After training by 9-22 to no score, the Wicklow players refused to line out for the second half and the match was awarded to Kildare.

References

Minor
All-Ireland Minor Hurling Championship